Arthropodium milleflorum, the pale vanilla lily, is a species of herbaceous perennial plants native to Australia. It occurs in various habitats including alpine areas and grows to between 0.3 and 1.3 metres high and 0.3 metres wide. The fleshy tubers were eaten by Aboriginal Australians. The plant has a strong vanilla fragrance, especially noticeable on warm days.

Flowering stems appear in late spring and summer, with two or more pendulous white, pale blue or pink flowers at each node. The tubers are 20–30 mm long and 3–5 mm in diameter. Arthropodium minus is a similar but smaller species with only one flower per node.

Plants may be propagated from seed or by dividing the tubers.

References

milleflorum
Flora of New South Wales
Flora of South Australia
Flora of Tasmania
Flora of Victoria (Australia)